Matmos is an experimental electronic music duo originally from San Francisco but now residing in Baltimore. M. C. (Martin) Schmidt and Drew Daniel are the core members, but they frequently include other artists on their records and in their performances, including notably J Lesser. Apart from releasing twelve full-length studio albums and numerous collaborative works, Matmos is also well known for their collaboration with Icelandic singer and musician Björk, both on studio recordings and live tours. After being signed to Matador Records for nine years, Matmos signed with Thrill Jockey in 2012. The name Matmos refers to the seething lake of evil slime beneath the city Sogo in the 1968 film Barbarella.

Notable work
In 1998, Matmos remixed the Björk single Alarm Call. Subsequently, Matmos worked with Björk on her albums Vespertine (2001) and Medúlla (2004), as well as her Vespertine and Greatest Hits tours. In November 2004, Matmos spent 97 hours in the Yerba Buena Center for the Arts as artists in residence, performing music with friends, musical guests and onlookers. The live album Work, Work, Work, essentially a "best of" collection of the session, was released as a free download from their website.

Matmos gained notoriety for their use of samples including "freshly cut hair" and "the amplified neural activity of crayfish" on their first album and "recorded the snips, clicks, snaps, and squelches of various surgical procedures, then nipped and tucked them into seven remarkably accessible, melodic pieces of experimental techno" for their album A Chance to Cut Is a Chance to Cure.

In 2011, Matmos participated in a programmed evening of events with the visual arts organisation Auto Italia South East. The event was produced in collaboration with record label Upset The Rhythm and included contributions from experimental electronic musicians Jon Wiese and Birds of Delay. Matmos have since collaborated with a large number of visual artists and arts organisations, including Cafe Oto and Metal.

In 2015, Matmos appeared in the documentary Soundhunters directed by Beryl Koltz and broadcast on the Franco-German channel arte as well as on many channels abroad.

Personal lives
M. C. Schmidt and Drew Daniel are also a couple, as stated in an interview in BUTT Magazine.

Schmidt formerly worked as a teacher in the New Genres Department at the San Francisco Art Institute.

Daniel received a Ph.D. in English from the University of California, Berkeley with a dissertation on the literary cult of melancholy directed by Janet Adelman. He is currently an associate professor in the Department of English at Johns Hopkins University.  This brought the band to relocate their home base to Baltimore in August 2007. Daniel also has a personal dance music project, the Soft Pink Truth.  He is a contributing writer to the online music magazine Pitchfork, and wrote an essay about the Throbbing Gristle album 20 Jazz Funk Greats for the Continuum Books series 33 1/3. Both Schmidt and Daniel appeared in the Sagan music film Unseen Forces by Ryan Junell.

Discography

Albums

EPs
 Full On Night Split Disc with Rachel's (2000, Quarterstick)
 California Rhinoplasty (2001 Feb 12, OLE-501)
 Rat Relocation Program (2004)
 For Alan Turing (2006)
 The Ganzfeld EP (2012, on Thrill Jockey 315)

Limited edition
 Matmos Live with J Lesser (2002)
 A Viable Alternative to Actual Sexual Contact, as Vague Terrain Recordings (2002, Piehead Records)
 "A Paradise of Dainty Devices: interludes, micromedia & sound edits" (limited edition of 100, for their "Wet Hot EuroAmerican Summer Tour", 2007)
 Polychords : Promo Single released on Matador
 I Want Snowden/Sheremetyevo Breakdown Blues, split single with the Disco Yahtzee Empire (2013)

References

External links

 
Matmos page at Matador Records

Matmos at Myspace
Matmos at furious.com

Electronic music groups from California
Intelligent dance musicians
Folktronica musicians
American electronic music duos
Male musical duos
Queercore groups
LGBT-themed musical groups
American LGBT musicians
Musical groups established in 1995
1995 establishments in California
Thrill Jockey artists
Matador Records artists
Locust Music artists